Stenetriidae is a family of crustaceans belonging to the order Isopoda.

Genera

Genera:
 Caecostenetrium
 Calafia Carvacho, 1983
 Hansenium Serov & Wilson, 1995

References

Isopoda